Faustino Rupérez Rincón (born 29 July 1956) is a Spanish former professional road racing cyclist who raced between 1979 and 1985.  Ruperez is most famous for capturing the overall title at the 1980 Vuelta a España.

He finished 4th in the 1979 Vuelta a España, won the 1981 Volta a Catalunya and finished 2nd overall at the 1984 Tour of the Basque Country behind Sean Kelly.

Since retiring from competitive cycling, Rupérez has served as a directeur sportif for the Spain national team.

Career achievements

Major results

1977
 1st  Overall Cinturón a Mallorca
1st Stages 2 & 4
 1st  Overall Volta a Lleida
1978
 6th Overall Tour de l'Avenir
1979
 1st  Road race, National Road Championships
 1st Prueba Villafranca de Ordizia
 1st Stage 5b Vuelta a Aragón
 1st Stage 5 Costa del Azahar
 2nd Overall Setmana Catalana de Ciclisme
 3rd GP Navarra
 4th Overall Vuelta a España
1980
 1st  Overall Vuelta a España
1st Stages 5 & 7
 1st  Overall Vuelta a Asturias
1st Stage 2
 4th Overall Tour of the Basque Country
 4th Overall Volta a Catalunya
 5th Overall Vuelta a Andalucía
1981
 1st  Overall Volta a Catalunya
 1st  Overall Vuelta a Burgos
1st Stage 2
 1st Overall Six Days of Madrid (with Donald Allan)
 1st Stage 3 Vuelta a Cantabria
 3rd Clásica de San Sebastián
 4th Subida al Naranco
 4th Trofeo Masferrer
 8th Overall Vuelta a España
1982
 1st Giro del Piemonte
 1st GP Villafranca de Ordizia
 1st GP Pascuas
 1st Stage 4a Vuelta a Burgos
 2nd Overall Vuelta a Asturias
1st Stage 5
 2nd Overall Volta a la Comunitat Valenciana
 2nd Subida a Arrate
 4th Overall Vuelta a España
 4th Overall Vuelta a Andalucía
 4th Subida al Naranco
 6th Overall Volta a Catalunya
 9th Clásica de San Sebastián
 10th Overall Giro d'Italia
 10th Overall Tour of the Basque Country
1983
 2nd Overall Volta a Catalunya
 2nd Overall Setmana Catalana de Ciclisme
 2nd Clásica de Sabiñánigo
 2nd Subida a Arrate
 3rd Overall Vuelta a Asturias
1st Stage 2
 4th Road race, UCI Road World Championships
 5th Clásica de San Sebastián
 7th Overall Giro d'Italia
 7th Overall Tour of the Basque Country
 10th Overall Vuelta a España
1984
 1st  Overall Vuelta a Asturias
 1st Stage 4 Vuelta a La Rioja
 2nd Overall Tour of the Basque Country
 2nd Overall Vuelta a Burgos
 7th Overall Setmana Catalana de Ciclisme
 10th Clásica de San Sebastián
1985
 1st Memorial Alberto Fernandez
 2nd Trofeo Luis Puig
 10th Clásica de San Sebastián

Grand Tour general classification results timeline

References

External links

1956 births
Living people
Sportspeople from the Province of Soria
Cyclists from Castile and León
Vuelta a España winners
Spanish Vuelta a España stage winners
Spanish male cyclists